The Sint Maarten national under-20 football team is the official under-20 football team the Caribbean Island of Sint Maarten, under the control of the Sint Maarten Soccer Association. The association is a member of CONCACAF and the Caribbean Football Union and has therefore been eligible to participate in the CONCACAF Under-20 Championship and other sanctioned tournaments since 2002.

CONCACAF Under-20 Championship

Matches

2017

2018

2022

References

 U20
CONCACAF teams not affiliated to FIFA
Football in Sint Maarten
Under-20
Caribbean national under-20 association football teams